Pioneer Junior-Senior High School is a public high school in Royal Center, Indiana. It is part of the Pioneer Regional School District and offers grades 8 through 12. Pioneer has won 7 State Championship titles. Pioneer was the first school in the state ever to win 3 state championships in one year. In the 2020-2021 school year the girls of Pioneer won the state championships for Volleyball, Basketball, and Softball.

See also
 List of high schools in Indiana
 Hoosier North Athletic Conference
 Royal Center, Indiana

References

External links
 Official website

Public high schools in Indiana
Schools in Cass County, Indiana
Public middle schools in Indiana
Buildings and structures in Cass County, Indiana